is a professional Japanese baseball outfielder for the Fukuoka SoftBank Hawks of Nippon Professional Baseball (NPB).

Early baseball career
Uebayashi participated with Takahiro Kumagai and Kosuke Baba in the 2rd grade summer the 94th Japanese High School Baseball Championship, 3rd grade spring the 85th Japanese High School Baseball Invitational Tournament and 3rd grade summer the 98th Japanese High School Baseball Championship  at the Sendai Ikuei Gakuen High School.

Professional career
On October 24, 2013, Uebayashi was drafted by the Fukuoka SoftBank Hawks in the 2013 Nippon Professional Baseball draft.

2014–2015 season
In 2014 season, Uebayashi played in informal matches against Shikoku Island League Plus's teams and amateur baseball teams, and played in the Western League of NPB's minor leagues.

On May 21, 2015, Uebayashi debuted in the Pacific League against the Orix Buffaloes. And on August 25, he recorded his first hit and home run with a Grand slam against the Chiba Lotte Marines. Uebayashi played in the 2015 Pacific League Climax Series and the 2015 Japan Series in the postseason. On November 25, he was honored for the Western League Batting Leader Award, the Western League Most Stolen base Leader Award, the Western League Outstanding Player Award, the Western League Outstanding Performance Award, the Western League Rookie of the Year Award, and the Western League Expectation Award at the NPB AWARDS 2015. In 2015 season, Uebayashi played 15 games in the Pacific League.

2016–2020 season
In 2016 season, Uebayashi played 14 games in the Pacific League.

In 2017 season, Uebayashi finished the regular season in 134 games with a batting average of .260, a 13 home runs, a RBI of 51, and a 12 stolen bases. And he played in the 2017 Pacific League Climax Series and the 2017 Japan Series in the postseason.

In 2018 season, Uebayashi played in all 143 games and recorded a batting average of .270, a 22 home runs, a RBI of 62, and a 13 stolen bases. And the 14th triple was the first record in 65 years in the NPB with the top result of the Pacific League in 2018.  And he played in the 2018 Pacific League Climax Series and the 2018 Japan Series in the postseason.

In 2019 season, Uebayashi finished the regular season in 99 games with a batting average of .194, a 11 home runs, a RBI of 31, and a 10 stolen bases. And he played in the 2019 Pacific League Climax Series and the 2019 Japan Series in the postseason.

In 2020 season, Uebayashi finished the regular season in 69 games with a batting average of .181, a 6 home runs, a RBI of 20, and a 8 stolen bases. And he played in the 2020 Pacific League Climax Series and the 2020 Japan Series in the postseason.

2021 season–present
On June 29, 2021, Uebayashi was hit in the shoulder by a pitch in a farm game. He was later diagnosed with a fractured right shoulder blade, necessitating a recovery period of 4-6 weeks. As a result, he finished the regular season with only 39 appearances.

In 2022 season, Uebayasi had batted .301 with one home run and 12 RBI in 33 games to start the season. However, he injured his right leg in practice before a game against the Saitama Seibu Lions on May 18, and on May 20 he was diagnosed with a ruptured Achilles tendon that required four weeks of hospitalization and six months of rehabilitation, making it impossible for him to return during the season.

International career
In 2013, Uebayashi represented the Japan national baseball team at the 2013 18U Baseball World Cup.

On November 25, 2017, Uebayashi represented the Japan national baseball team at the 2017 Asia Professional Baseball Championship. In the match against South Korea national baseball team On November 16, he hit a three-run home run in the bottom of the tenth inning after the team lost three points in the top of the tenth inning.

On October 26, 2018, he was selected Japan national baseball team at the 2018 MLB Japan All-Star Series.

On February 27, 2019, he was selected for Japan national baseball team at the 2019 exhibition games against Mexico.

References

External links

 Career statistics - NPB.jp
51 Seiji Uebayashi PLAYERS2022 - Fukuoka SoftBank Hawks Official site

1995 births
Living people
Fukuoka SoftBank Hawks players
Japanese baseball players
Nippon Professional Baseball outfielders
Baseball people from Saitama (city)